Bezhan is a village in the Korçë County, southeastern Albania. At the 2015 local government reform it became part of the municipality Kolonjë.

References

Populated places in Kolonjë, Korçë
Villages in Korçë County